Sumy Municipal Gallery (ukr. - Сумська муніципальна галерея, "СМуГа") - a modern cultural institution of Sumy. It was created to familiarise Sumy citizens and guests with modern art. The gallery is a department of the Agency of Promotion "Sumy" (ukr. - Агенція промоції "Суми").

General data 
The gallery opened on 5 September 2009.  The gallery includes two general exposition halls . The curator is Dmytro Yevdokimchyk.

Ukrainian art
Sumy
Modern art museums
Art museums and galleries in Ukraine